Sean Carroll may refer to:

Sean B. Carroll (born 1960), American biologist
Sean M. Carroll (born 1966), American physicist
Seán Carroll (1892–1954), Irish Sinn Féin politician
Sean Carroll (police officer), involved in the 1999 shooting of Amadou Diallo